Sorkheh Deh may refer to:

Sorkheh Deh, Harsin, Kermanshah Province
Sorkheh Deh, Salas-e Babajani, Kermanshah Province
Sorkheh Deh-e Olya, Lorestan Province
Sorkheh Deh-e Sofla, Lorestan Province
Sorkheh Deh, Markazi
Sorkh Deh, Qom
Sorkheh Deh, Tehran

See also
Deh Sorkheh (disambiguation)
Sorkhdeh (disambiguation)